Brian Grundy (born 9 May 1945) is an English former professional football winger. He played in the Football League for Bury.

Career
Grundy qualified as a schoolteacher and played part-time for Wigan Athletic in the Cheshire League, scoring eight goals in 71 appearances for the club between 1963 and 1967. In November 1967 he played for Wigan against Bury in a Lancashire Cup game, scoring and impressing Bury manager Les Shannon to the extent that he was signed by Bury the following week. He went full-time in January 1968 and was part of the Bury side that won promotion from Division Four that season.

Released by Bury at the end of the 1970–71 season, Grundy joined Great Harwood Town in July 1971. He went on to play for Bangor City and Morecambe before returning to Wigan Athletic for a second spell in September 1977, making a further four appearances for the club. In May 1978 he moved from Northwich Victoria to Winsford United before being transferred to Mossley for a fee of £100 in March 1979. He was released by Mossley in November 1979 and later had three years as manager of Glossop North End before taking over as manager of Mossley in December 1983. He was sacked in October 1984 after a poor start to the 1984–1985 season.

While managing Glossop and Mossley, Grundy was the landlord of a pub in Glossop. He later emigrated to Spain.

References

External links
 Career statistics

1945 births
Living people
Wigan Athletic F.C. players
Bury F.C. players
Great Harwood Town F.C. players
Bangor City F.C. players
Morecambe F.C. players
Winsford United F.C. players
Mossley A.F.C. players
Glossop North End A.F.C. managers
Mossley A.F.C. managers
English Football League players
People from Atherton, Greater Manchester
English football managers
Association football wingers
English footballers